Time of Our Lives is the ninth studio album by Australian pop singer Marcia Hines, released in 1999 by Warner Music Australia; it peaked at #17.

It was nominated for 'ARIA Award for Best Adult Contemporary Album' at the ARIA Music Awards of 2000,

Album information
In 1998, Marcia met with The Rockmelons' Bryon Jones and Ray Medhurst, who oversaw the production of the album and assisted Hines in selecting songs and producers for each track.
The album was recorded between the UK and USA and took two years.

Hines promoted the album in February 1999 by performing at the Sydney Gay and Lesbian Mardi Gras, and she opened the Sydney Olympic Stadium in front of 100,000 people.
Hines embarked on touring throughout the latter part of 1999.

Review
The Australian Jazz Agency said:It's vintage Marcia[,] but it's also completely fresh and up to date. From the groovy reggae[-]based "Woo Me", penned by the Rockies as a nod to Marcia's West Indian heritage to slam[-]dunk dance tracks "Which Way is Up" and an updated version of a Marcia standard "I Got the Music in Me" produced in Chicago by hot dance re-mixer Mark Picciotti (sic). Then there are the big ballads, two of which are penned by the best in the business, Diane Warren (think Cher, Celine Dion, Bon Jovi). Marcia not only tears at the heartstrings, she rips them to shreds on these Warren originals, "When You Cry" and "Making My Way". A highlight of the album is undoubtedly a haunting version of the theme from Valley of the Dolls, which was first recorded by Dionne Warwick."It was a song I really wanted to sing but it's a really hard song to sing," says Marcia. "The day I came home from recording it I thought I could die now I was so happy with the vocal."

Singles
The first single was a cover of Irene Cara's hit "What a Feeling" and peaked at #66 in Australia and #23 in New Zealand.
The second single was "Makin' My Way" and peaked at #71 in Australia.
The third single was the title track "Time of our Lives", which peaked at #31 in June 1999. This was the highest-charting single from the album.

Track listing
CD

Charts
"Time of our Lives" debuted and peaked at #17 in Australia.

References

1999 albums
Marcia Hines albums
Warner Music Group albums